Michael Erwin (born 6 June 1943) is a former Australian rules football player who played in the VFL between 1962 and 1964 for the Collingwood Football Club and from 1965 to 1968 for the Richmond Football Club.

Erwin crossed to Coburg in the VFA during the 1968 season and was captain/coach from 1969 to 1972, leading the Lions to the 1970 2nd Division premiership. He played in the Port Melbourne 1974 VFA premiership side and went on to coach Prahran to the 1978 VFA premiership.  He commenced the 1982 season as reserves coach at Collingwood before taking over as senior coach from Tom Hafey after he was sacked in the middle of the 1982 season. He coached the Magpies for the final twelve games of the 1982 season. Erwin, however was not retained as Collingwood Football Club senior coach at the end of the 1982 season and was replaced by John Cahill as Collingwood Football Club senior coach.

References 
 Hogan P: The Tigers Of Old, Richmond FC, Melbourne 1996

External links 
 
 

1943 births
Living people
Australian rules footballers from Victoria (Australia)
Collingwood Football Club players
Richmond Football Club players
Collingwood Football Club coaches
Coburg Football Club players
Port Melbourne Football Club players
Coburg Football Club coaches
Prahran Football Club coaches